The al-Bahr Mosque or Masjid al-Bahr (Misgad HaYam, meaning in all languages The Sea Mosque, is the oldest extant mosque in the historical part of Jaffa, Israel. Built in 1675, It is situated on the HaAliya HaShniya Street near the harbour. Due to its proximity to the Mediterranean Sea, fishermen and sailors used the mosque, as well as nearby inhabitants of the surrounding area. Built by the 'Azza /Alazzeh family as inscribed in stone above the entrance next to Bismillah.

References

Bibliography

16th-century mosques
Mosques in Tel Aviv
Old Jaffa